National Archives and Records Administration v. Favish et al., 541 U.S. 157 (2004) is a United States Supreme Court ruling about the Freedom of Information Act concerning the release of photos surrounding the death of Vince Foster, then Deputy White House Counsel. The court ruled unanimously that a family has the right to invoke a deceased individual's right to privacy and the unwarranted invasion of privacy exception in the Act must have evidence of improper conduct to overturn the exception.

References

See also 

 United States Department of Justice v. Reporters Committee for Freedom of the Press
 McCambridge v. Little Rock, 298 Ark. 219, 231–232, 766 S. W. 2d 909, 915 (1989)

United States Supreme Court cases
United States Supreme Court cases of the Rehnquist Court
2004 in United States case law
Freedom of information in the United States